Ramudu Bheemudu is a 1964 Indian Telugu-language film directed by Tapi Chanakya. It was produced by D. Ramanaidu under the Suresh Productions banner. It stars N. T. Rama Rao, Jamuna and L. Vijayalakshmi , with music composed by Pendyala. The film was a major box office success.

The film was the debut of D. Rama Naidu's Suresh Productions banner into the film industry and it is N. T. Rama Rao's first dual-role film. Satyanarayana was body double for N. T. Rama Rao in climax scenes. The film is considered a trendsetting venture and became an inspiration for later films with similar storyline. Chanakya remade the film in Tamil as Enga Veettu Pillai (1965). It was also remade in into Hindi as Ram Aur Shyam (1967), in Malayalam as Ajayanum Vijayanum (1976,) and Kannada as Mojugara Sogasugara (1995).

Plot 
Ramudu is an innocent rich young man who has been in the guardianship of his uncle Panakala Rao since his childhood. This uncle of his is both crooked and wicked and simply wants to usurp Ramudu's property, and is just waiting for an appropriate opportunity. Ramudu is made to attend to all the domestic chores and is often beaten by his uncle at the slightest opportunity and is generally treated like a slave even though he is the sole heir to large amounts of money and property. His uncle is just a guardian of Ramudu's property...and since his uncle wants to usurp Ramudu's property...the uncle raises Ramudu as a coward and puts fear in the heart of Ramudu. One day Ramudu thinks he has had enough of this torture and runs away from home.

Bheemudu is a villager who is interested in loafing around and staging plays, which his mother strongly disapproves of. After he comes back home from one such stage play, he is taken to task by his mother. In order to escape the wrath of his mother, Bheemudu also flees his home and lands in the nearby city.

Both of them enter the same hotel and unexpectedly exchange their respective places. Thus Ramudu goes to the other's village, enters the house of Bheemudu, is taken care of lovingly by Bheemudu's mom and falls in love with the village girl Santhi; on the other hand, Bheemudu [the villager], takes the place of the rich Ramudu in the latter's bungalow and falls in love with the cultured and city-bred Leela. Bheemudu, who is in the place of Ramudu, now understands that he has to bring Ramudu's uncle Panakala Rao to his senses so that the property that really belongs to Ramudu, should be restored to Ramudu. Ramudu, now in the role of Bheemudu, starts enjoying the love and affection of the new family members. However, Panakala Rao learns of this change of places and attempts to take advantage of this situation. At the end, Ramudu and Bheemudu turn out to be twins who got separated during the Godavari Pushkarams. All ends well in the film with Ramudu marrying Santhi and Bheemudu marrying Leela.

Cast 
N. T. Rama Rao as Ramudu & Bheemudu (dual role)
Jamuna as Leela
L. Vijayalakshmi as Shanti
S. V. Ranga Rao as Ranganatham
Rajanala as Panakala Rao
Relangi as Jayaram
Ramana Reddy as Sarabhaiah
Mikkilineni as Director Somaiah
Raavi Kondala Rao as Registrar
D. Ramanaidu as Lawyer (cameo)
Santha Kumari as Susheela
Rushyendramani as Venkamma
Suryakantham as Sundaramma
Hemalata as Nainamma
Girija as Kamala
Kuchala Kumari as Dancer (Song Undile Manchi Kalam)

Soundtrack 
Music was composed by Pendyala.

Remakes

References

External links 
 

1960s Telugu-language films
1964 films
Films directed by Tapi Chanakya
Films scored by Pendyala Nageswara Rao
Indian drama films
Suresh Productions films
Telugu films remade in other languages
Twins in Indian films